Gaetano Zompini (25 September 1700 – 20 May 1778) was an Italian printmaker and engraver, known for his prints depicting workers from the lower classes in Venice.

Born in Nervesa della Battaglia, he apprenticed with Niccolò Bambini. He also completed frescoes in Palazzo Marin in Venice. At times, his etchings recall the painted work of Pietro Longhi and other genre painters of Northern Italy. He died in Venice.

L'arti che vanno per via nella città di Venezia (1753) is his major work, containing 60 prints of Venetian workers. They include the following, an inventory of possible trades in the mid-18th century: 
Aseo (Vinegar Seller); Astrologa (Fortune-teller); Botter (Barrel Maker and Repairer); Cappe (Mussel Seller); Caraguoi (Snail Vendor); Carboneri (Colliers); Cava Rii (Canal Dredgers); Cazze, e Sculieri (Utensil Seller); Codega (Lantern Bearer); Contadin con Polame (Poulterer); Conza Careghe (Chair Maker and Repairer); Conza Lavezzi (Tinker and Cat Gelder); Conza Zocoli (Clog and Shoe Cleaner); Coro d'Orbi (Blind musicians); Cura gattoli (Street sweeper); Dai Foli (Bellows Repairer and Seller); Dai Vovi (Egg Seller); Dalla Latte (Milkman); Dalla Semola (Bread Baker); Dalle Puine (Milk and Cheese Seller); Dolce de Vedeletto (Blood Pudding Seller); Erbariol (Costermonger); Fà ballari Cani (Street Entertainer); Fassi per battello (Wood Trader); Fenestrer (Glazier); Fiorer (Flower Seller); Fitta Palchi (Keeper of Theater Boxes); Foleghe, e Mazzorini (Duck Vendor); Forcae, Elera ec. (Peddler of Vegetables, Brooms, and Ivy); Frittole (Fritter Maker); Fruttariol (Fruit Vendor); Gua (Knife Grinder); Impizza Ferali (Lamplighter); Inchiostro (Ink and Rat Poison Seller); L'Esca, e Solferini (Seller of Tinder, Matches, and Flints); Marcer (Draper); Marmotina (Marmot Keeper); Metti Massere (Maidservants' Agent); and Mondo Novo (Peep box Operator).

References

External links
 Prints of Zompini in the National Gallery of Art
Biography

1700 births
1778 deaths
People from the Province of Treviso
Italian etchers
Italian engravers
Artists from Venice
Neoclassical artists